The attorney general of New Jersey is a member of the executive cabinet of the state and oversees the Department of Law and Public Safety. The office is appointed by the governor of New Jersey, confirmed by the New Jersey Senate, and term limited. Under the provisions of the New Jersey State Constitution, the Attorney General serves a concurrent term to the governor (starting on the third Tuesday of January following the election and ending on the third Tuesday following the next election). Matt Platkin became the acting officeholder on February 14, 2022, following his nomination by Governor Phil Murphy.

The conventional wisdom is that the attorney general cannot be removed from office except "for cause" by the governor or by way of legislative impeachment.

It is fourth in the line of succession after the lieutenant governor of New Jersey, president of the New Jersey Senate, and speaker of the New Jersey General Assembly. The attorney general cannot also serve as the lieutenant governor.

List of office holders
Holders of the office of attorney general include:

Colonial period

Post-independence

References

External links
 New Jersey Attorney General official website
 New Jersey Attorney General articles at ABA Journal
 News and Commentary at FindLaw
 New Jersey Revised Statutes at Law.Justia.com
 U.S. Supreme Court Opinions - "Cases with title containing: State of New Jersey" at FindLaw
 New Jersey State Bar Association
 New Jersey Attorney General John Jay Hoffman profile at National Association of Attorneys General
 Press releases at New Jersey Attorney General

1704 establishments in New Jersey